Blood of Redemption is a 2013 American crime action thriller film directed by Giorgio Serafini and Shawn Sourgose. The film was released on direct-to-DVD and Blu-ray in the United States and Canada on September 24, 2013. The film stars Dolph Lundgren, Billy Zane, Gianni Capaldi, Vinnie Jones and Robert Davi.

Premise 
Quinn (Billy Zane) is the son of a famous and powerful mafioso. In the course of one night, he loses everything. Betrayed by someone from his inner circle, Quinn is set up and arrested. His father (the patriarch of the criminal empire) is killed, and his brother suspects he is behind it all. When he is released from jail, he tries to escape the demons from his past, but that becomes an impossible task. Campbell (Vinnie Jones) is the ruthless new leader of "The Company", and he will not let Quinn live in peace. So instead of escaping them, Quinn begins to fight back. He joins forces with his former henchman and friend, The Swede (Dolph Lundgren), and tries to regain his powerful position within the mafioso by fighting his enemies head on.

Cast 

 Dolph Lundgren as Axel "The Swede"
 Billy Zane as Quinn Forte Grimaldi
 Gianni Capaldi as Kurt Grimaldi
 Vinnie Jones as Campbell
 Robert Davi as Hayden
 Robert Miano as Sergio Grimaldi
 Massi Furlan as Boris
 LaDon Drummond as Agent West
 Stephanie Rae Anderson as Escort #1
 Manny Ayala as Bum Hitman
 Al Burke as Officer Bauer
 Zoli Dora as Campbell Henchman #2
 Mario E. Garcia as Officer Paul Crain
 Jelly Howie as Loryn
 Clint Glenn Hummel as Private Evans
 Elisabeth Hunter as Officer Smith
 Scott Ly as Lin Chau
 Gus Lynch as Officer Brown
 Marcus Natividad as Asian Assassin
 Brad Nelson as Junkyard
 Tasha Reign as Senator's Escort #1
 Raven Rockette as Lin Chau's Escort
 Gilbert Rosales as Man Outside Bar
 Chuck Saale as LAPD Captain Bruce
 Jenny Shakeshaft as Call Girl
 Rikki Six as Senator's Escort #2
 James Storm as Senator Roswald
 Reena Tolentino as Gorgeous Woman
 Scott Vancea as Quinn
 Franco Vega as Officer Hunter

Release

Home media
Entertainment One Films released the DVD and Blu-ray on September 24, 2011, in the United States and Canada.

Reception

Critical response
Nav Qateel of Influx Magazine gave the film a C+ rating and called it a "guilty pleasure".  Ian Jane of DVD Talk rated it 2/5 stars and wrote that the film fails to live up to its potential as a fun B film.  David Johnson of DVD Verdict wrote, "While Blood of Redemption isn't embarrassingly terrible, it leaves much to be desired as a crime thriller, burdened by clunky storytelling, indifferent acting, and unsatisfactory plot twists. As an action film, it's even more wanting."

See also 
 Dolph Lundgren filmography

References

External links 
 
 
 

2013 films
2013 direct-to-video films
2013 crime drama films
2013 action thriller films
American crime drama films
American action thriller films
2010s English-language films
Entertainment One films
Films about organized crime in the United States
Films produced by Gianni Capaldi
Films shot in Los Angeles
2010s American films